Tai Chi Boxer, also known as Tai Chi II, is a 1996 Hong Kong martial arts film directed by Yuen Woo-ping and Zhang Xinyan. It is a sequel to Yuen's earlier film Tai Chi Master, with Lau Shun and Yu Hai returning, albeit in different roles. The film stars Jacky Wu, Christy Chung, Sibelle Hu, Billy Chow, Mark Cheng and Lau Shun. The film was released on 14 March 1996. Tai Chi Boxer was Jacky Wu's first Hong Kong film debut, and Yuen's last directorial effort until 2010. This Set Of the Movie is From The Late Qing Era.

Cast
Jacky Wu as Hawkman / Jackie
Christy Chung as Rose
Sibelle Hu as Jackie's Mother
Billy Chow as Wong, Great Kick of the North
Mark Cheng as Lam Wing
Lau Shun as Officer Tsao (Rose's Father)
Yu Hai as Yeung Shan-wu (Jackie's Father)
Ji Chun-hua as Da Bu-liang (Bald Villain)
Darren Shahlavi as Smith
Tam Chiu as Ya Sung
Kam Tak-mau as Lin Tung
Kau Chim-man as Siou Bu-liang
Xu Xiang-dong as Bao Biou

DVD release
DVD was released by Hong Kong Legends in the United Kingdom in Region 2 on 17 June 2002.

References

1996 films
1996 martial arts films
1990s martial arts comedy films
1990s Cantonese-language films
Films directed by Yuen Woo-ping
Films set in the Ming dynasty
Golden Harvest films
Hong Kong martial arts comedy films
Hong Kong sequel films
Kung fu films
Shaolin Temple in film
Tai chi films
Wushu films
1990s Hong Kong films